Richard Pius Miles, O.P. (May 17, 1791 – February 21, 1860) was an American prelate of the Roman Catholic Church.  He served as the first bishop of the Diocese of Nashville in Tennessee from 1838 until his death in 1860.

Biography

Early life 
Richard Miles was born on May 17, 1791, in Prince George's County, Maryland.  His family moved to Kentucky when he was age five. After joining the Dominican Order in October 1806, he was ordained a priest on September 21, 1816. He then worked as a missionary in Ohio and Kentucky for 22 years, also founding a community of Dominican nuns and a school under the Sisters of Charity. He served as pastor in parishes in Somerset, Kentucky, and Zanesville, Ohio.

Bishop of Nashville 
On July 28, 1837, Miles was appointed the first bishop of the newly erected Diocese of Nashville by Pope Gregory XVI. He received his episcopal consecration on September 16, 1838, from Bishop Joseph Rosati, with Bishops Simon Bruté and Guy Chabrat serving as co-consecrators.

Arriving alone in Nashville, Miles took up residence in a boarding house and almost immediately fell seriously ill with a fever. A priest who happened to be travelling through Nashville arrived, and with his assistance Miles recovered. His parishioners consisted of approximately 100 families scattered throughout the state. Miles traveled on horseback to meet with them. 

Miles took part in laying the cornerstone of St. Vincent de Paul Church in Baltimore, Maryland and in November 1845 assisted at the consecration of Saint Peter in Chains Cathedral Cathedral in Cincinnati, Ohio. During his tenure, Miles ordained the first priest in Tennessee, and established a seminary and a hospital, run by the Sisters of Charity of Nazareth from Bardstown, Kentucky, and an orphanage run by the sisters of St. Dominic. He dedicated the Cathedral of the Blessed Virgin of the Seven Sorrows in Nashville in 1848 to replace the Cathedral of the Holy Rosary.

Death and legacy 
Richard Miles died in Nashville on February 21, 1860, at age 68. At the time of his death, the diocese comprised 12,000 Catholics, three priests, 14 churches, six chapels, and 13 missions. 

In 1972, over 100 years after his death, Mile's body was exhumed and was found to be incorrupt. A cause has since been opened for his canonization.

References

Episcopal succession

1791 births
1860 deaths
People from Prince George's County, Maryland
American Dominicans
Roman Catholic bishops of Nashville
Catholic Church in Ohio
Religious leaders from Kentucky
Catholics from Maryland
19th-century Roman Catholic bishops in the United States